Yeo Min-ji (born 27 April 1993) is a South Korean footballer who plays as a forward for Gyeongju KHNP in the WK League.

Honours

International
 FIFA U-17 Women's World Cup: 2010
 AFC U-17 Women's Asian Cup: 2009

Individual
 FIFA U-17 Women's World Cup
Golden Ball: 2010
Golden Shoe: 2010
 AFC U-17 Women's Asian Cup
 Golden Shoe: 2009

References

External links 
 

 Yeo Min-ji at the Korea Women's Football Federation (KWFF)

1993 births
Living people
People from Gimhae
Sportspeople from South Gyeongsang Province
South Korean women's footballers
Women's association football forwards
South Korea women's under-17 international footballers
South Korea women's under-20 international footballers
South Korea women's international footballers
WK League players
2019 FIFA Women's World Cup players